"Have Yourself a Merry Little Christmas" is a song written in 1943 by Hugh Martin and Ralph Blane and introduced by Judy Garland in the 1944 MGM musical Meet Me in St. Louis. Frank Sinatra later recorded a version with modified lyrics. In 2007, ASCAP ranked it the third most performed Christmas song during the preceding five years that had been written by ASCAP members.
In 2004 it finished at No. 76 in AFI's 100 Years...100 Songs rankings of the top tunes in American cinema.

Meet Me in St. Louis
The song was written in 1943 for the film Meet Me in St. Louis, for which MGM had hired Martin and Blane to write several songs. Martin was vacationing in a house in the neighborhood of Southside in Birmingham, Alabama, that his father Hugh Martin had designed for his mother as a honeymoon cottage, located just down the street from his birthplace, and which later became the home of Martin and his family in 1923. The song first appeared in a scene in which a family is distraught by the father's plans to move to New York City for a job promotion, leaving behind their beloved home in St. Louis, Missouri, just before the long-anticipated 1904 World's Fair begins. In a scene set on Christmas Eve, Judy Garland's character, Esther, sings the song to cheer up her despondent five-year-old sister, Tootie, played by Margaret O'Brien.

Lyrics and revisions
Some of the original lyrics penned by Martin were rejected before filming began. When presented with the original draft lyric, Garland, her co-star Tom Drake and director Vincente Minnelli criticized the song as depressing, and asked Martin to change the lyrics. Though he initially resisted, Martin made several changes to make the song more upbeat. For example, the lines "It may be your last / Next year we may all be living in the past" became "Let your heart be light / Next year all our troubles will be out of sight". Garland's version of the song, which was also released as a single by Decca Records, became popular among United States troops serving in World War II; her performance at the Hollywood Canteen brought many soldiers to tears.

In 1957, when Frank Sinatra approached Martin to record the song, he asked him to revise the lyrics to promote more positive themes; he particularly pointed out the line "until then we'll have to muddle through somehow," saying "the name of my album is A Jolly Christmas. Do you think you could jolly up that line for me?" Martin's revised lyric was "hang a shining star upon the highest bough." Martin made several other alterations, changing from the future tense to the present, so that the song's focus is a celebration of present happiness rather than anticipation of a better future. (However, Sinatra had recorded the original song's lyrics in 1948.) On The Judy Garland Show Christmas Special, Garland sang the song to her children Joey and Lorna Luft with Sinatra's revised lyrics.

In 2001, Martin, occasionally active as a pianist with religious ministries since the 1980s, wrote an entirely new set of lyrics to the song with John Fricke, "Have Yourself a Blessed Little Christmas," a religious version of the secular Christmas standard. The song was recorded by female gospel vocalist Del Delker with Martin accompanying her on piano.

In 2002, NewSong lead singer Michael O'Brien noted the line "through the years, we all will be together if the Lord allows," which was part of the original song, was purged and replaced with "if the fates allow" to remove religious reference when the song was released. He noted while a pastor in a California church in 1990 that he had met Martin, who played piano at the church where O'Brien was serving for an evening, and the pastor was told, "That's the original way I wrote it, so I want you to sing it this way."

Collaboration controversy
Although Ralph Blane is credited with writing the music for many of Martin's songs, Martin claimed in his autobiography that he wrote both music and lyrics to all of the songs in Meet Me in St. Louis and that "all of the so-called Martin and Blane songs (except for Best Foot Forward) were written entirely by me (solo) without help from Ralph or anybody else." His explanation for allowing Blane equal credit for the songs was: "I was reasonably content to let him receive equal screen credit, sheet music credit, ASCAP royalties, etc., mainly because this bizarre situation was caused by my naive and atrocious lack of business acumen."

Cover versions
Judy Garland's 1944 version of the song reached No. 27 on the Billboard charts.

In 2009, Keyshia Cole reached number 58 on the US Hot R&B/Hip-Hop Songs chart with a version of the song.

In 2011, Michael Bublé's version reached number 98 on the top 100 charts.

In 2012, this song is featured in the fourth season of the Fox musical-comedy series Glee for the Christmas episode "Glee, Actually". Jacob Artist (Jake Puckerman), Chris Colfer (Kurt Hummel), Darren Criss (Blaine Anderson), Heather Morris (Brittany Pierce), Chord Overstreet (Sam Evans), and Mark Salling (Noah Puckerman) recorded vocals for this version. Melissa Benoist (Marley Rose) sang all of Morris's lines in the episode version.

In 2014, English singer Sam Smith released a cover version which debuted at number 90 on the Billboard Hot 100, the first time a version of the song had charted on the Billboard list. The song reached top ten on the US and Canadian adult contemporary charts and on the US Holiday chart. It also peaked inside the top forty in Finland, Norway, Sweden, Denmark, Slovakia, the Czech Republic and Switzerland.

In 2016, Josh Groban reached number 1 on the US Adult Contemporary charts with a version of the song.

In 2017, Phoebe Bridgers covered the song and released it on her 2020 If We Make It Through December EP.

In 2018, John Legend reached number 1 on the US Adult Contemporary charts with a version of the song from his album A Legendary Christmas, featuring Esperanza Spalding on duet vocals.

In 2022, Philippines Queen of Soul Jaya recorded a version of the song with Pop Singer Garth Garcia.

Lorna Luft version

In 1995, American singer Lorna Luft recorded a cover of "Have Yourself a Merry Little Christmas" which was reworked as a "virtual duet" with her mother Judy Garland. It was produced by Gordon Lorenz and released as a CD single only in the UK by Carlton Sounds label. A music video featured Luft performing the song in a studio interspersed with classic footage of Garland singing to a then 11-year-old Luft on the 1963 Christmas episode of her CBS variety television series The Judy Garland Show, all placed on the same screen.

Luft's version of the song peaked at number 100 on the UK Singles Chart on December 16, 1995.

Track listing

"Have Yourself A Merry Little Christmas (Radio Edit)" – 3:16
"Me And My Shadow / The Nearness Of You" – 4:38
"Have Yourself A Merry Little Christmas (Extended Edit)" – 4:02

Charts

Michael Bublé version

Christina Aguilera version

Sam Smith version

Certifications

Frank Sinatra version

Sam Smith version

Michael Bublé version

See also
 List of number-one adult contemporary singles of 2016 (U.S.)
 List of number-one adult contemporary singles of 2018 (U.S.)

References

External links
Entertainment Weekly article – with the history of the song's lyrics, including three different versions

1944 songs
2014 singles
Capitol Records singles
Songs written by Ralph Blane
Songs written by Hugh Martin
Frank Sinatra songs
Judy Garland songs
Sam Smith (singer) songs
Songs from Meet Me in St. Louis
American Christmas songs
Jazz compositions in G-flat major